Harrapool is a village, that lies on the right hand side of Broadford Bay, in Isle of Skye, Scottish Highlands and is in the Scottish council area of Highland.

The town of Broadford lies in the other corner of Broadford Bay to the east along the A87 road.

References

Populated places in the Isle of Skye